The 2022–23 RC Lens season is the club's 117th season in existence and the club's third consecutive season in the top flight of French football. In addition to the domestic league, Lens participated in this season's edition of the Coupe de France. The season covers the period from 1 July 2022 to 30 June 2023.

Players

First-team squad

Out on loan

Transfers

In

Out

Pre-season and friendlies

Competitions

Overall record

Ligue 1

League table

Results summary

Results by round

Matches 
The league fixtures were announced on 17 June 2022.

Coupe de France

References

RC Lens seasons
Lens